Vale of Avoca may refer to:

 Vale of Avoca (bridge), a viaduct over the Yellow Creek in Toronto
 Vale of Avoca (ravine), a valley in the Yellow Creek in Toronto

See also
 River Avoca, a river in Ireland
 Avoca (disambiguation)